"When It Changed" is a science fiction short story by American writer Joanna Russ. It was first published in the anthology Again, Dangerous Visions.

Synopsis
Janet Evason lives on Whileaway, an all-female human colony planet whose inhabitants produce offspring by combining ova because all their males died in a plague 30 generations earlier. When male astronauts arrive from Earth, they say that Earth has become genetically deficient and tell her that they would like to reproduce with women. Janet's wife tries to kill the astronauts; Janet stops her, but realizes that their very existence will change Whileaway society forever.

Reception
"When It Changed" won the 1972 Nebula Award for Best Short Story, and was a finalist for the 1973 Hugo Award for Best Short Story.

Themes
In the afterword, Russ states "When It Changed" was written to challenge ideas in science fiction that had not, at the time of writing, been addressed.  These ideas were related to the way women—and societies consisting solely of women—were handled by writers who are male. She wrote:

(Note: The Laumer story was actually named “War Against the Yukks”.)

Russ also mentions Ursula K. Le Guin's novel The Left Hand of Darkness as an influence on the story.

Awards and nominations
 Nebula Award for Best Short Story 1973
 Hugo Award for Best Short Story nominee 1973
 James Tiptree, Jr. Award (retroactive, 1996)

References

External links

1972 short stories
James Tiptree Jr. Award-winning works
Again, Dangerous Visions short stories
Feminist science fiction
Single-gender worlds
Nebula Award for Best Short Story-winning works